Lin Yuping (born 28 February 1992) is a Chinese association football player.

Career statistics

International

References

1992 births
Living people
Chinese women's footballers
China women's international footballers
Women's association football defenders
2019 FIFA Women's World Cup players
Footballers at the 2018 Asian Games
Asian Games silver medalists for China
Asian Games medalists in football
Medalists at the 2018 Asian Games
Footballers at the 2020 Summer Olympics
Olympic footballers of China